Scream, Dracula, Scream! is an album by American punk rock band Rocket from the Crypt, released in 1995 by Interscope Records. It was the band's first major-label release. Music videos were filmed for the singles "On a Rope," "Born in '69" and "Young Livers," and the band embarked on extensive tours of the US, UK and Europe. They experienced a surge of popularity in the UK, where "On a Rope" entered the music charts at #12 and was a hit on MTV Europe, earning them rave reviews in New Musical Express and allowing them to play Top of the Pops.

The album also made the band an alternative rock radio hit in the US, where their videos were featured on MTV and the album received many positive reviews in both mainstream and underground music presses. A large headlining tour in support of the album ensued in 1996, and there were supporting tours with Rancid and Soundgarden. During these tours the band gained a reputation for a series of interesting and, at times, seemingly ludicrous gimmicks and stage antics which included holding raffles during live performances, spinning a large game show wheel to determine set lists, onstage fire breathing, annual Halloween and New Year's shows, and the wearing of coordinated and progressively more ornate stage costumes. In Europe the band also hosted a German variety show, played children's shows and morning shows, and did interviews with fashion magazines. While unorthodox, these antics increased the band's reputation as an energetic live act and helped to increase album sales.

Scream, Dracula, Scream! was the last of three releases by Rocket from the Crypt in 1995. The EP The State of Art is on Fire and LP Hot Charity had preceded the album that year, and singer/guitarist John Reis would later refer to these three records as a "trilogy".

"Scream, Dracula, Scream!" also had different copies for Japan and Australia. Both of them had songs from the 'Hot Charity' recording. The Japan release just had the songs put on the CD, but the "Australian Bonus CD Tour Edition" had a bonus CD. The Australian copy had "Pushed", "My Arrow's Aim", "Lorna Doom", "Shucks", "Cloud Over Branson", and "Feathered Friends". The Japanese copy also had "Pushed", "My Arrow's Aim", and "Lorna Doom". But instead of "Shucks", "Cloud Over Branson", and "Feathered Friends", they had "Guilt Free", "Poison Eye", and "Pity Yr Paws". All together, the whole 'Hot Charity' recording was released on the two versions.

Recording
Scream, Dracula, Scream! was Rocket from the Crypt's most ambitious recording to date. Using the extensive recording budget granted them by Interscope, the band employed numerous guest musicians, a string section, additional engineers and mixing sessions, and experimented with several instruments they had not used before. According to the album's liner notes the album was rehearsed and recorded over a 2-month period, with the basic tracks recorded live on a 4-track machine and overdubs of the backing vocals and orchestra recorded later. The album's title was taken from the lyrics of a Wesley Willis song.

The album's liner notes also state that the band intended Scream, Dracula, Scream! to consist of one cohesive body of music, with traditional silence between track separations replaced with string, woodwind, and brass passages. However, Interscope demanded a more standardized album so the master tapes were cut and edited into traditional-length tracks.

Legacy
The album was included in the book 1001 Albums You Must Hear Before You Die.

Track listing
"Middle" - 1:00
"Born in '69" - 2:16
"On a Rope" - 2:53
"Young Livers" - 2:54
"Drop Out" - 3:00
"Used" - 2:39
"Ball Lightning" - 3:50
"Fat Lip" 2:42
"Suit City" - 2:34
"Heater Hands" - 3:36
"Misbeaten" - 4:02
"Come See, Come Saw" - 3:39
"Salt Future" - 3:51
"Burnt Alive" - 4:37
"Pushed" (Japanese Bonus Track) - 2:25
"My Arrows Aim" (Japanese Bonus Track) - 3:18
"Lorna Doom" (Japanese Bonus Track) - 2:16
"Guilt Free" (Japanese Bonus Track) - 3:41
"Poison Eye" (Japanese Bonus Track) - 2:43
"Pity Yr Paws" (Japanese Bonus Track) - 3:30

Bonus CD "Australian Bonus CD Tour Edition"
"Pushed" - 2:25
"My Arrows Aim" - 3:18
"Lorna Doom" - 2:16
"Shucks" - 2:14
"Cloud Over Branson" - 2:52
"Feathered Friends" - 4:21

Personnel
Speedo (John Reis) - guitar, lead vocals
ND (Andy Stamets) - guitar, backing vocals
Petey X (Pete Reichert) - bass, backing vocals
Apollo 9 (Paul O'Beirne) - saxophone, percussion, backing vocals
JC 2000 (Jason Crane) - trumpet, percussion, backing vocals
Atom (Adam Willard) - drums
John Reis, Sr. - accordion on "Used"
Geoff Harrington - Hammond B3 organ on "Come See, Come Saw"
Eric Christian - guitar solo on "Come See, Come Saw"
Raymond Kelley - cello
Don Palmer - violin
Jay Rosen - violin
James Ross - viola
Mick Collins, Frank Daly - additional vocals
Diane Gordon, Natalie Burks, and Latina Webb - backing vocals on "Born in '69" and "Come See, Come Saw"
Roger Freeland, Gene Miller, and Joseph Pizzulo - backing vocals on "Used" and "Misbeaten"

Technical
John Reis, Jr. - producer, conductor
Donnell Cameron - recording, engineer
Eddie Miller - recording, engineer
Andy Wallace - mixing (tracks: 2-5, 7, 8, 10, 12, 13)
Steve Cisco - mixing assistant
Mark Trombino - engineer, mixing (tracks: 1, 6, 9, 11, 14)
Kelle Musgrave - production coordination
Henry Kadinski - recording supervisor
Miki Vukovich - photography
Mike Nelson - layout, videograbs, type

References

1995 albums
Rocket from the Crypt albums
Interscope Records albums
Hardcore punk albums by American artists